Panisse may refer to:

 Panisse, a French variation of farinata made from chickpea flour 
 Chez Panisse, the Californian restaurant
 Jean Panisse (1928–2021), a French actor
 Panisse, a character from:
 Fanny (musical)
 Fanny (1961 film)